Deathlike Silence Productions (DSP) was a Norwegian independent record label founded in Oslo in 1987 (initially as Posercorpse Music) that focused on black metal. DSP supported the black metal revival in the early 1990s. Helvete was the headquarters of DSP.

History
The label was founded in 1987 by Øystein Aarseth, also known as Euronymous, who operated the label until his murder in 1993. The name was derived from the Sodom song "Deathlike Silence" (from their 1986 release Obsessed by Cruelty).

At first, the label mainly signed Norwegian acts, but as early as 1990 Aarseth had desired to establish a Swedish branch with Morgan Håkansson of Marduk, and towards its final years its also released an album by Japanese artist Sigh. Aarseth was considering signing Rotting Christ, Masacre (Colombia) and Hadez (Peru) before his death.

Before the label's demise in 1994, it was planned to release Monumentum's debut album In Absentia Christi. Darkthrone had threatened to release their second album A Blaze in the Northern Sky through Deathlike Silence when Peaceville Records would not due to their sudden change in genre. Voices of Wonder "took over Deathlike Silence Productions after the death of Euronymous."

Releases on DSP
 Anti-Mosh 001: Merciless – The Awakening (1990)
 Anti-Mosh 002: Burzum – Burzum (1992)
 Anti-Mosh 003: Mayhem – Deathcrush (1993)
 Anti-Mosh 004: Abruptum – Obscuritatem Advoco Amplectére Me (1993)
 Anti-Mosh 005: Burzum – Aske (1993)
 Anti-Mosh 006: Mayhem – De Mysteriis Dom Sathanas (1994)
 Anti-Mosh 007: Sigh – Scorn Defeat (1993)
 Anti-Mosh 008: Enslaved – Vikingligr Veldi (1994)
 Anti-Mosh 009: Abruptum – In Umbra Malitiae Ambulabo, in Aeternum in Triumpho Tenebraum (1994)

See also
 Lists of record labels

Notes

References

External links
 Deathlike Silence Productions discography

Norwegian independent record labels
Record labels disestablished in 1993
1993 disestablishments in Norway
Black metal record labels
Defunct record labels